The Brunner-Winkle Bird was a three-seat taxi and joy-riding aircraft produced in the US from 1928 to 1931.

Design and operation

The Model A version was powered by the ubiquitous Curtiss OX-5, and featured a welded steel-tube truss fuselage with metal and fabric skinning. The wings, constructed of Spruce and plywood were also covered with metal and fabric skinning. The Model A had a reasonable performance for an OX-5 powered aircraft. The Model A's ease of handling led to its entry into the 1929 Guggenheim Safety Airplane contest, where it was awarded the highest ratings for a standard production aircraft.

The Model A was awarded Group 2 approval no 2-33 in January 1929 for the first nine aircraft serial no. 1000 to 1008. Aircraft serial no. 1009 upwards were manufactured under Air Transport Certificate no. 101.

The Model B followed on from the initial Bird design and was fitted with the uncowled Kinner radial engine. Production aircraft were designated BK.

Variants
Data from: aerofiles.com

Model Aoriginal production version with Curtiss OX-5 engine (ca. 80 built)
Model ATversion with Milwaukee Tank engine (2 converted from Model A)
Model Bversion with Kinner K-5 engine (1 prototype)
Model BKproduction version of Model B (84 built)
Model Cversion with Wright J-5 engine (1 built)
Model CCversion with Curtiss R-600 Challenger engine (1 built)
Model CJversion with Jacobs LA-1 engine (6 built)
Model CKversion with Kinner B-5 engine (50 built)
Model RKexport version of Model CK (1 built)
Model E4-5 seat version with enclosed cabin and Kinner B-5 engine (1 built)
Model Fversion with Packard DR-980 (1 built)

Specifications (Bird Model A)

See also

Aircraft of comparable role, configuration and era 
(Partial listing, only covers most numerous types)

Alexander Eaglerock
American Eagle A-101
Buhl-Verville CA-3 Airster
Butler Blackhawk
Command-Aire 3C3
Parks P-1
Pitcairn Mailwing
Spartan C3
Stearman C2 and C3
Swallow New Swallow
Travel Air 2000 and 4000
Waco 10

Related lists 

 List of aircraft
 List of civil aircraft

References

Citations

Bibliography
 
 Photos of Brunner-Winkle Bird 

1920s United States civil utility aircraft
Biplanes
Single-engined tractor aircraft
Aircraft first flown in 1928